Grant Thornton LLP is the American member firm of Grant Thornton International, the seventh largest accounting network in the world by combined fee income. Grant Thornton LLP is the sixth largest U.S. accounting and advisory organization. The firm operates 59 offices across the US with approximately 8,500 employees, 550 partners, and produces annual revenue in excess of US$1.9 billion.

History

Early history 

In 1924, Alexander Richardson Grant, a 26 year old senior accountant with Ernst & Ernst (later Ernst & Young) decided to leave the firm and start his own business with William O’Brien. Alexander Grant & Co. was built in Chicago and it provided services as a middle market firm.  The firm was growing rapidly and nationally under the guidance of several new leaders during the next three decades.

In 1961, the company established its national office in Chicago and earned net revenue of more than $5 million. During this time, a competitive firm that was also committed to providing services to middle market established in Europe, and this firm later became known as Binder Dijker Otte & Co. (BDO).

During the mid-1960s, the firm decided to expand its business internationally. In 1969, Alexander Grant & Co. merged with companies from Australia, Canada and the United Kingdom to form an organization called Alexander Grant Tansley Witt.

By 1980, Alexander Grant & Co. had joined with 49 international accounting firms, including a UK firm named Thornton Baker, and formed a professional global network, Grant Thornton International.

In 1985, Alexander Grant & Co. merged with Fox & Co. and became the ninth largest accounting firm in the United States, just behind the nation's "Big Eight" firms. At that time, the company had 80 offices and more than 3,000 employees.

In 1986, Alexander Grant & Co. changed its name to Grant Thornton, resulted from its affiliation with the United Kingdom firm Thornton Baker, which also changed its name to Grant Thornton.

Recent history 
In 2002, Grant Thornton acquired 7 offices, 43 partners and 396 employees from ex-Arthur Andersen.

In June 2014, Grant Thornton announced J. Michael McGuire as the firm's chief executive officer.

In August 2019, Brad Preber assumed CEO duties of the firm.

As of 2019, Grant Thornton was the sixth largest accounting firm in the United States and had 59 offices with more than 550 partners and 7,000 employees. Its revenue for fiscal year 2018 was $1.7 billion.

In March 2020, Grant Thornton LLP teamed up with GroupSense to offer digital crime mitigation technology.

Operations 
Headquartered in Chicago, Grant Thornton LLP has three service lines: audit, tax, and advisory services. Specific advisory services and areas of expertise include: Sarbanes-Oxley compliance, mergers and acquisitions advice, tax, and business valuations. Target industries include construction, distribution, energy, financial services, food and beverage, healthcare, hospitality and restaurants, life sciences, manufacturing, not-for-profit organizations, private equity, public sector, real estate, retail, technology, and transportation.

Services 
Grant Thornton offers three main service lines:
 Audit/Assurance: Provides not only the financial statement audits, but also uses professional tools and processes to conduct integrated audits required by SEC and under the Sarbanes-Oxley Act.
 Tax: Offers clients professional tax services including: federal, local and state, international tax advisory & compliance, compensation & benefits consulting, private wealth services, and tax accounting & risk advisory services.
 Advisory: services in business strategy, governance, risk & compliance, performance improvement, and information technology.

Tax Desk 
Tax desks is developed by Grant Thornton US and it connects other member firms in different countries to help clients grow their business and solve their common problems in the global market. Grant Thornton US has established the desks between the United States and the UK, the United States and China, and the United States and Japan.

Criticisms 
 Several audit deficiencies in the firm's audit work at eight companies were found by Public Company Oversight Board when it was doing the inspection of Grant Thornton's 2005 audit. In the PCAOB's report, the Board concluded that the firm didn't have enough evidence to support its audit opinions. Grant Thornton responded to the PCAOB's criticism on June 4, 2007. In its response letter, the firm wrote "We strongly disagree with the use of overly broad comments such as ‘failed to identify’, ‘failed to perform,’".
 In April 2012, Grant Thornton was accused by its client Bill Yung and his family. The firm hid real information from its clients and sold a tax shelter to them. There was a 90% chance the IRS would reject the shelter. Kentucky State Court ordered Grant Thornton to pay $20 million in compensatory damages and $80 million in punitive damage.

Sponsorship 
 In December 2017, Grant Thornton signed a five-year marketing partnership deal with the PGA Tour and replaced Pricewaterhouse Coopers as the "Player's Partner". During this time, Grant Thornton also entered into a separate deal with professional golfer Rickie Fowler.
 In March 2016, Grant Thornton signed a multi-year agreement with the National Center for the Middle Market (NCMM). In 2015, Grant Thornton has become a multi-year sponsor of the Charlotte Hornets basketball team. The Hornets and Grant Thornton will enter into a multi-year advertising arrangement that includes the renaming of the Crown Club as the "Grant Thornton Crown Club."

References

Grant Thornton
International management consulting firms
Management consulting firms of the United States
Privately held companies based in Illinois
Consulting firms established in 1924
Accounting firms of the United States
Companies based in Chicago
1924 establishments in Illinois